Anthony Terpiloff was an English television screenwriter active in the period 1961–1978. He is particularly known for The Poet Game (1972) and his contributions to Gerry Anderson's science fiction series Space: 1999. His writing for Space: 1999 included Earthbound, Death's Other Dominion, Collision Course, The Infernal Machine and Catacombs of the Moon.

External links
 Anthony Terpiloff & Elizabeth Terpiloff Barrows Official Website

English television writers
Living people
Year of birth missing (living people)